or  may refer to:

People
  (born 1955), Japanese footballer

Places
 Kawachi Province, an old province of Japan
 Kawachi District, Tochigi, a district in Tochigi Prefecture, Japan
 Minamikawachi District, Osaka, a district in Osaka Prefecture, Japan
 Henei Commandery, a commandery of China from Han dynasty

City
 Hanoi, the capital city of Vietnam
 Kawachi, Osaka, a former city in Osaka Prefecture, Japan
 Kawachinagano, Osaka, a city in Osaka Prefecture, Japan

Town
 Kawachi, Ibaraki, a town in Ibaraki Prefecture, Japan
 Kawachi, Tochigi, a former town in Tochigi Prefecture, Japan
 Kōchi, Hiroshima, a former town in Hiroshima Prefecture, Japan

Village
 Kawachi, Ishikawa, a former village in Ishikawa Prefecture, Japan

Literature
 Hanoi (novel), a Killmaster spy novel

Music
 Hanoï (album), an Indochine album
 Kawachi ondo, a genre of Japanese music

Ship
 , lead ship of her class battleship during World War I
 , a two-ship class of dreadnought battleships built for the Imperial Japanese Navy

Station
 Kōchi Station (Hiroshima), a train station in Higashihiroshima, Hiroshima Prefecture, Japan

See also
 Kawachi (disambiguation)
 Kawauchi (disambiguation)
 Kochi (disambiguation)
 Kōchi Station (disambiguation)